Praedenecenti was an early medieval Slavic tribe, mentioned only in the Royal Frankish Annals in 822 and 824. They lived in the buffer zone between the Carolingian and Bulgarian empires. The Royal Frankish Annals associated them with the Abodriti, while modern scholars have also connected them to other Slavic tribes, especially the Braničevci or Merehani. The Praedenecenti sought assistance from the Franks against the Bulgars, but they obviously lost their independence because they were not mentioned after 824.

Sources 

The Praedenecenti was an "enigmatic" tribe living near the Middle Danube frontier of the Carolingian Empire in the 820s. The Royal Frankish Annals mentioned them twice (under the years 822 and 824), but no other written primary source referred to them. Since the Royal Frankish Annals apparently associated them with the Abodriti (a Slavic tribe near the Baltic Sea), Vasil Gyuzelev equates them with the "Ostabtrezi" (or Eastern Abodriti), whom the Bavarian Geographer listed among the tribes living along the eastern borders of the Carolingian Empire.

Ethnonym and ethnicity 

The origin of their ethnonym is unclear. Gyuzelev proposes, the Praedenecenti's name derived from an Old Bulgarian expression, pred'n čdi, meaning "the leading/noble family/children". Archaeologist Gábor Vékony also says, the ethnonym is of Slavic origin, but he proposes that it refers to a people on "this bank" of the river Donets. Imre Boba and Pavel Georgiev write, the name is connected the Latin word for spoil (praeda), showing that the inhabitants of the Carolingian Empire regarded the Praedenecenti as plunderers.

The Royal Frankish Annals listed the Praedenecenti among the Slavic peoples. Pavel Jozef Šafařík and Joachim Lelewel associated them with the Braničevci. Based on the similarity of the two ethnonyms, Lubor Niederle also said that the Braničevci and the Praedenecenti were identical. Other scholars have not accepted this identification. Boba identified them as "booty-taking" Moravians in accordance with his alternative theory of the location of Great Moravia. Archaeologist Silviu Oța proposes that they are the same as the Merehani.

Territory 

The Praedenecenti inhabited "Dacia on the Danube", according to the Royal Frankish Annals. The same source also mentioned that they were neighbors of the Bulgars. Their prolonged conflicts with the Bulgars and their attempts to seek assistance from the Franks imply that they inhabited a wide region between Bulgaria and the Carolingian Empire.

Most historians associate "Dacia on the Danube" with the Roman province of "Dacia Traiana" to the north of the Danube. They conclude that the Praedenecenti lived in modern Banat (the region between the rivers Tisza and Mureș, and the Lower Danube). Due to the lack of archaeological finds which can certainly be dated to the 9th century, the presence of Praedenecenti in Banat has not been substantiated. Archaeologist Béla Miklós Szőke identifies "Dacia on the Danube" with the ancient province of Dacia Ripensis, to the south of the Danube, saying that the Praedenecenti lived near the Timočani (in present-day Serbia or Bulgaria).

Georgiev emphasizes, the Carolingian chronicles also referred to the land between the Tisza and the Danube when writing of Dacia, thus the Praedenecenti may have also controlled this region. Associating the Praedenecenti with the "Ostabtrezi", he also say that their homeland was a well-fortified region, because the Bavarian Geographer stated that there were "more than 100 fortresses" on the Ostabtrezi's land. He also proposes that the Bavarian Geographer may have referred to the ancient earthworks to the east of the Tisza, which are now known as Devil's Dykes.

History 

Avars and other peoples from the Eurasian steppes who were subjected to them inhabited the wider region of the Tisza river till the end of the 8th century. The Avar Khaganate disintegrated due to a series of Frankish campaigns and internal conflicts after 791. The 10th-century Suda encyclopedia states that the Bulgars also inflicted defeats on the Avars in the early 9th century. An Avar dignitary, the kapkhan, went to the Carolingian Empire in early 805, asking Charlemagne to grant a territory to his people, because they "could not stay in their previous dwelling places on account of the attacks of the Slavs", according to the Royal Frankis Annals. The report shows that new power centers, led by Slavic warlords, emerged along the Middle Danube shortly after the collapse of the khaganate.

According to a scholarly theory, the Praedenecenti were Abodrites who moved to the Carpathian Basin at an unspecified time. Their envoys' visit in the Carolingian Empire was recorded for the first time under the year 822. The envoys attended the general assembly that Emperor Louis the Pious held at Frankfurt in autumn. They gave presents to him, along with the delegates of other Slavic tribes and the Avars.

Their envoys returned to the empire in 824. They came to Aachen to seek the emperor's assistance against the Bulgars. The Bulgars had already sent delegates to the emperor, but Louis the Pious did not receive them, because he had been informed of the arrival of the envoys of the Praedecenti. After meeting with the Praedenecenti, the emperor ordered them to return to their homeland and come back when he would receive the Bulgar envoys. Historian Charles R. Bowlus assumes, Louis the Pious "wanted to confront the Bulgars with the accusations" of the Praedenecenti.

After their envoys' meeting with Louis the Pious in 824, the Praedenecenti were never mentioned. Georgiev says, their envoys were present when the emperor met with the Bulgar delegates in Aachen in May 825. The Bulgars wanted to determine the border between the Carolingian Empire and Bulgaria, but no compromise was reached. The fate of the Praedenecenti is unknown. According to scholarly theories, they were most probably forced to accept the Bulgars' rule, although some of them may have fled to the Carolingian Empire or settled among the Avars who still dwelled in the plains of the Carpathian Basin. The Praedenecenti lost their independence only after 832, according to Georgiev.

Notes

References

Sources

Primary sources

 Royal Frankish Annals (1972). In: Carolingian Chronicles: Royal Frankish Annals and Nithard's Histories (Translated by Bernhard Walter Scholz with Barbara Rogers); The University of Michigan Press; .

Secondary sources

 
 
 
 
 
 

South Slavic tribes
9th century in Serbia
9th century in Romania
History of Banat